Shahriar Shahriari (born May 30, 1956) is an American mathematician. He is the William Polk Russell Professor of Mathematics at Pomona College.

Early life and education
Shahriari was born on May 30, 1956, in Tehran, Iran, to Parviz and Zomorod Shahriari. He attended Oberlin College, graduating in 1977, and subsequently received his doctorate from the University of Wisconsin–Madison in 1986.

Career
Shahriari began teaching at Pomona College in 1989. In 2006, he published a calculus textbook titled Approximately Calculus.

Recognition
In 1998, Shahriari shared the Carl B. Allendoerfer Award with Dan Kalman and Robert Mena for their paper "Variations on an irrational theme—Geometry, dynamics, algebra". In 2015, he received the Mathematical Association of America's Deborah and Franklin Tepper Haimo Award for Distinguished Teaching in Mathematics, widely recognized as the top national prize for higher education math instruction.

References

External links
Pomona College faculty page

20th-century American mathematicians
Oberlin College alumni
Pomona College faculty
Living people
American people of Iranian descent
1956 births
21st-century American mathematicians